Alessandra Codazzi, called Sandra (11 November 1921 – 5 May 2010), was an Italian politician, trade unionist, and partisan.

Biography 
Codazzi was born on 11 November 1921 in Reggio Emilia. Firstborn of seven brothers and daughter of Colonel Alberto Codazzi, who was a descendant of Agostino Codazzi, geographer and national hero in Venezuela and Colombia.

During the Second World War she was partisan, making the messenger for the partisan brigade of Catholic inspiration Brigate Fiamme Verdi hidden in the Reggio Apennines, taking the name of "Rosario" to avoid being captured by the Nazi-Fascists. Graduated in literature and philosophy at the Università Cattolica del Sacro Cuore, a pupil of Giuseppe Dossetti, she first entered the Azione Cattolica and shortly afterwards in the CISL of Giulio Pastore, where she attended the "Long Course" at the CISL Study Center in Florence with Professor Mario Romani. In the CISL she took care of women and workers' rights until she became national secretary of CISL textiles. In 1976 she was elected Senator for the Christian Democrats, she held this position until 1987.

She worked and had close relations with her colleagues Anna Gabriella Ceccatelli, Tina Anselmi and Nilde Iotti.

She died in Rome on 5 May 2010.

Bibliography

References

External links 

 Italian Senate Page

1921 births
2010 deaths
Politicians of Emilia-Romagna
Italian trade unionists
Italian anti-fascists
Italian resistance movement members
21st-century Italian women politicians
Christian Democracy (Italy) politicians
Senators of Legislature VII of Italy
Senators of Legislature VIII of Italy
Senators of Legislature IX of Italy
Università Cattolica del Sacro Cuore alumni
Italian women trade unionists
20th-century Italian women
Female anti-fascists
Women members of the Senate of the Republic (Italy)